The  Niccolò Piccinni Conservatory was founded by the violinist and music critic Giovanni Capaldi in 1925, with headquarters in Villa Bucciero, Bari, Italy. It was the fourteenth music school to arise in Italy. First created as a music education high school ("Liceo Musicale"), in 1937 it was converted into a conservatory, and was named in honor of eighteenth-century Italian composer Niccolò Piccinni.

References

External links
 official site

Music schools in Italy
Education in Italy
Bari
Educational institutions established in 1925
1925 establishments in Italy